Biali may refer to
Laila Biali (born 1980), Canadian jazz singer and pianist
Berba language or Biali language of Benin
Biali Kurierzy, a group of Polish boy scouts and soldiers that existed in 1939–1940

See also
Bialis